Acacia lullfitziorum is a shrub belonging to the genus Acacia and the subgenus Phyllodineae that is endemic to south west Australia

Description
It generally has a prostrate or diffuse habit and will often form low-domed shaped mats. Like most species of Acacia it has phyllodes rather than true leaves. It blooms from August to October and produces yellow flowers.

Taxonomy
The species was first formally described by the botanist Bruce Maslin in 1999 as part of the work Acacia miscellany. The taxonomy of fifty-five species of Acacia, primarily Western Australian, in section Phyllodineae (Leguminosae: Mimosoideae) as published in the journal Nuytsia. It was reclassified as Racosperma lullfitziorum by Leslie Pedley in 2003 then transferred back to genus Acacia in 2006.

Distribution
It is native to an area in the Great Southern and Wheatbelt regions of Western Australia where it is commonly situated among granite rocks, on gravelly rises and in damp areas growing in gravelly, sandy, clay or loamy soils. It has a scattered distribution from around Coorow in the mnorth west to around Mount Barker in the south east.

See also
List of Acacia species

References

lullfitziorum
Acacias of Western Australia
Taxa named by Bruce Maslin
Plants described in 1999